Little Andrews Bay Marine Provincial Park is a provincial park in British Columbia, Canada, located on Ootsa Lake in the Nechako Country in that province's Central Interior. It is 102 ha. in size.

References

Provincial parks of British Columbia
Regional District of Bulkley-Nechako
Nechako Country
Year of establishment missing
Marine parks of Canada